The following is a list of notable presentation software.

Free and open-source software 

 Apache OpenOffice Impress
 Beamer
 Calligra Stage
 Collabora Online Impress for all Online, Mobile and Desktop apps. Enterprise-ready edition of LibreOffice
 LibreOffice Impress
 MagicPoint
 NeoOffice Impress
 OnlyOffice Desktop Editors
 Powerdot

Proprietary software

Commercial 

 Apple Keynote, part of its iWork suite – Mac, iOS
 Corel Presentations - Windows
 Documents To Go – Android, iOS, Windows Mobile, Symbian
 Gobe Productive presentation editor
 Hancom Office Show
 Microsoft PowerPoint – Windows and Mac
 Polaris Office – Android and Windows Mobile
 QuickOffice – Android, iOS, Symbian
 SoftMaker Presentations
 WPS Office Presentation – Windows and Linux

Freeware 

 Atlantis Nova – Windows
 Baraha – free Indian language software
 Bean
 Jarte
 SoftMaker Presentations
 WPS Office Presentation Personal Edition

Online 

 Apple Keynote
 Brainshark
 Google Slides
 Hancom Office Show
 Mentimeter
 Microsoft PowerPoint Online – free online service
 Microsoft Sway
 OnlyOffice
 Prezi
 SlideShare
 Wooclap

Historical 

 Adobe Persuasion
 AppleWorks (formerly ClarisWorks presentation editing) – Windows and Mac; also an older and unrelated application for Apple II
 CA-Cricket Presents
 Docstoc
 Harvard Graphics
 IBM Lotus Symphony
 Lotus Freelance Graphics – Windows
 Microsoft PowerPoint Viewer
 SlideRocket

See also 

 List of office suites
 Presentation program

References 

Presentation software
Lists of software